Speaking in tongues is the phenomenon of speaking in unintelligible utterances (often as part of religious practices).

Speaking in Tongues may also refer to:
 Angelic tongues, a term related to the concept of sung praise in Second Temple period Jewish materials
 Speaking in Tongues (Talking Heads album), 1983
 Speaking in Tongues (David Murray album), 1999
 Speaking in Tongues, a 2001 album by The Holmes Brothers
 Speaking in Tongues (Bizzy Bone album), 2005
 "Speaking in Tongues" (Arcade Fire song), 2011
 "Speaking in Tongues" (Hilltop Hoods song), 2011
 "Speaking in Tongues", a song from the Meat Loaf album Braver Than We Are
 Speaking in Tongues (speech), a speech written by Gloria E. Anzaldúa
 Speaking in Tongues (TV series), an Australian television program
 Speaking in Tongues, an Australian play by Andrew Bovell
 Speaking in Tongues (film), a 2009 documentary film

See also
 Speak in Tongues, a music venue in Cleveland, Ohio
 "Speak in Tongues", a song by Placebo from the 2009 album Battle for the Sun